Frankfurter is a surname. Notable people with the surname include:

David Frankfurter (1909–1982), Croatian–Israeli assassin of Nazi leader Wilhelm Gustloff
Felix Frankfurter (1882–1965), Associate Justice of the United States Supreme Court
Mavro Frankfurter (1875–1942), Croatian and Vinkovci rabbi
Philipp Frankfurter (c. 1450 – 1511), Viennese writer